The Clandestine Immigration and Naval Museum is a technical history museum located in Haifa, Israel.

The museum covers the maritime history of Israel – from clandestine immigration during the British Mandate for Palestine through the history of the Israeli navy since its inception.

The museum is named after David HaCohen, one of the leaders of the Jewish Yishuv. It was established by Colonel Yoske Coral and opened to the public in 1969. The museum is run by the Israeli Ministry of Defense. It stands next to the Israeli National Maritime Museum, dedicated to maritime history and archaeology.

Exhibits
Remnants of the INS Dakar, an Israeli submarine that disappeared on its voyage to Israel in 1968 and whose wreckage was located in 1999 after several decades of searches, are on display at the museum.
The following vessels are on permanent display:
 INS Mivtach, a decommissioned Sa'ar 2-class missile boat
 INS Gal, a retired Gal-class submarine
 INS Af Al Pi Chen, a clandestine immigration ship, built as a Royal Navy Mark 2 Tank Landing Craft in World War II

See also
List of museums in Israel

References

External links 

 Official webpage at Israeli Ministry of Defense

Israeli Navy
Jewish military history
Naval museums
Military and war museums in Israel
Museums in Haifa
1969 establishments in Israel
Museums established in 1969